MiamiCentral is a train station in Miami, Florida. Located in Downtown Miami, the station provides access to Brightline inter-city rail service and, in the future, Tri-Rail commuter rail service. The station is part of a  mixed-use complex, which includes  of residential, office, commercial, and retail development.

The station is located within walking distance of the Wilkie D. Ferguson Jr. Metromover station and the Historic Overtown/Lyric Theatre Metrorail station. The Government Center station, providing both Metromover and Metrorail service, is directly connected to MiamiCentral via a pedestrian bridge over NW 3rd Street. The station was built by All Aboard Florida, a subsidiary of Florida East Coast Industries (FECI) overseeing Brightline, and designed by Skidmore, Owings & Merrill in association with Zyscovich Architects.

History

Original FEC station: 1896–1963
MiamiCentral was originally a railroad station opened April 15, 1896 as the southern terminus of Henry Flagler's Florida East Coast Railway (FEC). The station was the southern end of the FEC line until 1905, when construction began to Key West via the Overseas Railroad. The FEC built a wooden passenger station building in 1912 at site of what would become the Dade County Courthouse. Construction on the courthouse was started in 1925 and finished 1928. FEC regularly serviced the site until January 23, 1963, when union workers for both companies went on strike.

At the insistence of the City of Miami, which had long fought to get rid of the tracks in the downtown section just north of the county courthouse, the downtown passenger terminal was demolished by November 1963. Although a new station was planned at the Buena Vista yard near North Miami Avenue and 36th Street (US 27), it was never built. The site of the old station was left as parking lots until construction of MiamiCentral began in 2014.

When FEC ended their passenger service, this left Seaboard Coast Line Railroad (service absorbed by Amtrak in 1971) as the sole intercity rail in Miami. They operated out of the decaying Allapattah terminal at Northwest 22nd Street and Seventh Avenue (US 441) until in 1978 Amtrak moved to its current location near Hialeah.

New station

In March 2012, All Aboard Florida, a former subsidiary of Florida East Coast Industries that also at the time owned the Florida East Coast Railway, announced plans to connect Miami and Orlando with Higher-speed passenger rail service. In May 2014, All Aboard Florida unveiled their plans for the  site, with construction anticipated to begin in late 2014.

In August 2014, preparatory work began with the removal of parking lots that had previously been located on the site. Construction of the facility began in mid 2015, when subterranean support pilings began to be built, and by the end of the year foundation and frame construction was underway. By October 2016, construction of the rail facility was about 70% complete, while work on the lower structure of the office and residential buildings had begun. When Brightline began revenue operations in January 2018 between West Palm Beach and Fort Lauderdale, MiamiCentral was still incomplete. Service to Miami was planned to begin at the end of April 2018. Brightline service to MiamiCentral commenced on May 19, 2018.

In its final design, MiamiCentral includes a  dining and grocery marketplace dubbed Central Fare,  of retail space, one residential building with 800 apartments, and two office buildings. It will have five tracks, with three serving Brightline trains and two serving Tri-Rail trains. The office buildings are 3 MiamiCentral (12 stories) and 2 MiamiCentral

The Tri-Rail commuter service is investing $70 million at the station in the "Tri-Rail Downtown Miami Link" project, which will allow Tri-Rail to operate into the station as a second terminal. Service will begin in 2023.

Station layout
Tracks 4 and 5, along with Platforms D and E, are expected to open in conjunction with Tri-Rail's Downtown Miami Link service.

Gallery

See also
Transportation in South Florida

References

External links

Brightline Official site
Tri-Rail Downtown Miami Link site

Brightline stations
Residential condominiums in Miami
Office buildings in Miami
Hotels in Miami
Passenger rail transportation in Florida
Florida East Coast Railway
Higher-speed rail
Railway stations in the United States opened in 2018
Transportation buildings and structures in Miami
2018 establishments in Florida
Proposed Tri-Rail stations
Skidmore, Owings & Merrill buildings
Former Florida East Coast Railway stations